Polyus is a research institute and production association in Moscow, Russia. It is part of the Shvabe Holding (Rostec group).

The Polyus Scientific Research Institute (NII Polyus) is closely associated with the Polyus Scientific Production Association (NPO Polyus), a small factory, and the Institute of Physics and Technology, all of which are located at the same address.

NPO Polyus produces lasers and associated components, electronics articles, and electrovacuum devices.

NII Polyus works in the field of quantum electronics and develops and manufactures experimental models in the areas of cryoelectronics, magnetism, and electrovacuum devices. NII Polyus oversees several laboratories and production enterprises. These production enterprises are located in Moscow Oblast, Tula, Ulyanovsk, and the Nizhniy Novgorod Oblast.

NII Polyus has also developed missile laser technology, including laser gyroscopes for missile nose cone guidance, various other types of solid-state multi-purpose lasers, laser components, and electro-optic equipment, and has carried out global positioning system work with Aeroflot and MiG aircraft.

References

External links

 Official website

Manufacturing companies of Russia
Research institutes in Russia
Companies based in Moscow
Shvabe Holding
Defence companies of the Soviet Union
Electronics companies of the Soviet Union
Ministry of the Electronics Industry (Soviet Union)
Research institutes in the Soviet Union